Suslin or Souslin (Russian: Суслин) is a Russian masculine surname; its feminine counterpart is Suslina or Souslina. It may refer to:

Alexander Suslin (died 1349), German Orthodox rabbi and Talmudist
Andrei Suslin (1950–2018), Russian mathematician known for
Suslin homology
Quillen–Suslin theorem
Galina Yermolayeva (rower) (née Suslina in 1948), Russian rower
Inna Suslina (born 1979), Russian team handball player
Lyudmila Suslina (born 1946), Russian figure skater
Mikhail Suslin (1894–1919), Russian mathematician known for
Suslin algebra
 Suslin cardinal, a transfinite cardinal number at which one obtains new Suslin sets
Suslin operation
Suslin's problem
 Suslin representation, a set of real numbers built up in a certain way
Sergey Suslin (1944–1989), Soviet judoka and sambo competitor
Viktor Suslin (1942–2012), Russian composer
Viktor Suslin (rower) (born 1944), Russian Olympic rower
Yury Suslin (born 1935), Russian Olympic rower, brother of Viktor

See also
Suslin's theorem (disambiguation), several theorems by Andrei or Mikhail

Russian-language surnames